Old Westbury is a village in the Towns of North Hempstead and Oyster Bay in Nassau County, on the North Shore of Long Island, in New York, United States. The population was 4,671 at the 2010 census.

The Incorporated Village of Old Westbury is one of the wealthiest villages in the country as well as the second-richest zip code in the New York State, topped only by Harrison in Westchester County. In 2007, Business Week dubbed Old Westbury as New York's most expensive suburb.  Old Westbury Gardens has been recognized as one of the three best public gardens in the world by Four Seasons Hotels magazine.

History 

Westbury was founded by Edmond Titus, and was later joined by Henry Willis, one of the first English settlers. Westbury had been a Quaker community of isolated farms until the railroad came in 1836. After the Civil War, the New York elite discovered that the rich, well-wooded flat countryside of the Hempstead Plains was a place to raise horses, and to hunt foxes and play polo at the Meadow Brook Polo Club.

The Village of Old Westbury was incorporated in 1924, separating itself from Westbury, the adjacent area that housed many of the families of the construction and building staffs for the Old Westbury mansions. The "Old" part of Old Westbury's name reflects the community's need for its postal address to be different from the Westbury in Cayuga County, as per postal requirements (it had been using a postal address of North Hempstead for this reason); residents did this when they wanted a local post office ca. 1841, and when they incorporated Old Westbury as a village, they felt that it would be confusing for the village name and post office name to be different from one another. The Village of Westbury, located adjacent to Old Westbury, adopted that designation when it incorporated in 1932 as Cayuga County's Westbury's name was no longer being used.

The area was originally known as Wallage, which is related to a Native American term roughly meaning "ditch" or "hole." By February 1663, it was known as Wood Edge, and by October 1675 it was known as "the Plains edge" or simply Plainedge. The name Westbury began to be used for the area around 1683. The name Westbury was chosen by Henry Willis, who named it after Westbury, Wiltshire, his hometown in England.

Westbury House was the residence of Henry Phipps' eldest son, John Shaffer Phipps. Today, the property is operated as Old Westbury Gardens. Robert Low Bacon built 'Old Acres' in the style of an Italian villa. Other landowners were Thomas Hitchcock and his family, Harry Payne Whitney and his wife the former Gertrude Vanderbilt, founder of New York's Whitney Museum, at Apple Green (formerly a Mott house), Cornelius Vanderbilt Whitney, whose estate is now subdivided into the Old Westbury Country Club and New York Institute of Technology. The architect Thomas Hastings built a modest house for himself, 'Bagatelle', in 1908. A. Conger Goodyear, then president of the Museum of Modern Art in New York City had a house built in 1938 by famed architect Edward Durell Stone, who also destined the building for Conger's museum. In 2003, the A. Conger Goodyear House was added to the National Register of Historic Places to protect the structure from being demolished to subdivide the expensive land surrounding it. The estate of Robert Winthrop, an investment banker and member of the Dudley–Winthrop family, for whom Winthrop-University Hospital was named, has been similarly preserved. Part of Gertrude Vanderbilt Whitney's estate and her sculpture studio has been preserved and maintained by one of her grandchildren, Pamela Tower LeBoutillier.

When Robert Moses was planning the Northern State Parkway, the powers of Old Westbury forced him to re-site it five miles (8 km) to the south. Once the parkway was completed, many residents found it to not be the eyesore they had been anticipating and regretted making their commutes more inconvenient than necessary. In the 1950s, the state purchased land from Charles E. Wilson, a former president of General Motors who needed to sell off his Old Westbury estate to pull himself out of financial crisis and relocate to the nation's capital to serve in President Dwight D. Eisenhower's cabinet. The land, which runs along an edge of the village, was used for the Long Island Expressway.

Geography

Demographics

As of the census of 2000, there were 4,228 people, 1,063 households, and 967 families residing in the village. The population density was 493.9 people per square mile (190.7/km2). There were 1,109 housing units at an average density of 129.5 per square mile (50.0/km2). The racial makeup of the village was 73.19% White, 4.24% African American, 0.02% Native American, 7.52% Asian, 3.67% from other races, and 2.37% from two or more races. Hispanic or Latino of any race were 17.14% of the population.

There were 1,063 households, out of which 43.2% had children under the age of 18 living with them, 82.2% were married couples living together, 5.9% had a female householder with no husband present, and 9.0% were non-families. Of all households 5.6% were made up of individuals, and 2.9% had someone living alone who was 65 years of age or older. The average household size was 3.33 and the average family size was 3.37.

In the village, the age distribution of the population shows 22.7% under the age of 18, 20.2% from 18 to 24, 19.9% from 25 to 44, 25.7% from 45 to 64, and 11.6% who were 65 years of age or older. The median age was 35 years. For every 100 females, there were 86.7 males. For every 100 females age 18 and over, there were 84.6 males.

The median income for a household in the village was $163,046, and the median income in the village was $184,298 for a family. The median earnings of the 899 households (89.6% of total households) in the village that took in earnings supplemental to income was $230,721. Males had a median income of $100,000+ versus $45,200 for females. The per capita income for the village was $72,932. About 1.1% of families and 3.5% of the population were below the poverty line, including 1.5% of those under age 18 and 3.3% of those age 65 or over.

Education

Public schools 

Residents are zoned to schools in one of four school districts, depending on where in the village they reside. They are the East Williston Union Free School District, the Jericho Union Free School District, the Roslyn Union Free School District, and the Westbury Union Free School District.

Private schools 
 Holy Child Academy – A private Catholic day school, grades K through 8.

Colleges and universities 
 New York Institute of Technology – A private undergraduate and graduate university.
 SUNY Old Westbury – A public, four-year liberal arts college.

Landmarks

 Meadow Brook Polo Club – The birthplace of American polo; longest-running polo club in the United States.
 Old Westbury Gardens – A public English style garden.

Notable people

 Jean Aberbach, art collector, founder of Hill & Range music publishers that controlled much of the Elvis Presley catalog
 Carol Alt, supermodel, television personality
 Frank Altimari, judge
 Artful, champion thoroughbred horse
 Ashanti, musician
 Jerome Ash, owner of Sam Ash Music stores
 Doe Avedon, fashion model and actress, wife of Richard Avedon, the inspiration for Audrey Hepburn's character in Funny Face (Avedon was legally adopted by the wealthy employer of her biological father who served as a butler until his death) 
 Robert Low Bacon, banker and congressman
 Florence Bellows Baker, philanthropist and horticulturist
 Charles T. Barney, president of Wells Fargo & Company, president of the Knickerbocker Trust Company
 Alva Belmont, socialite, woman's suffragist
 Oliver Belmont, son of August Belmont
 Harvey R. Blau, former mayor and deputy mayor; chairman and former CEO of Griffon Corporation
 Vira Boarman Whitehouse, woman suffragist, birth control proponent 
 Bold Reason, champion thoroughbred horse
 Albert C. Bostwick, Jr., steeplechase jockey, Thoroughbred racehorse owner/breeder/trainer, heir to the Standard Oil Trust
 Dunbar Bostwick, horseman, pilot, sportsman, heir to the Standard Oil Trust
 George Herbert Bostwick, US Tennis player, jockey, trainer
 Pete Bostwick, Standard Oil heir, tennis champion
 Buckpasser. champion thoroughbred horse
 Carl Andrew Capasso, NYC contractor involved in bribery and tax evasion scandal
Arielle Charnas, fashion designer and blogger
 Michael Cimino, film writer and director
 F. Ambrose Clark, equestrian, heir to Singer Sewing Machine Co.
 Eliot Cross, architect and owner of Cross and Cross
 Marguerite Sawyer Hill Davis, socialite and one of the wealthiest women of her time
 Herman Duryea, thoroughbred race horse owner and breeder
 Herman Edwards, Kansas City Chiefs coach
 Hervé Filion, harness racing driver
 Floyd H. Flake, member of U.S. House of Representatives
 Max Fortunoff, founder/owner of Fortunoff department stores
 Bethenny Frankel, SkinnyGirl cocktail founder, television personality (Real Housewives of New York City, Bethenny Ever After), author of multiple titles making The New York Times Best Seller list
 Robert L. Gerry, Jr., polo champion, real estate investor
 Erica Gimbel, socialite, reality television star on Princesses: Long Island
 Anson Goodyear, philanthropist, chairman of Gaylord Container Corporation, director of Paramount Pictures, director of the Gulf, Mobile and Ohio Railroad, first president of the Museum of Modern Art
 Victoria Gotti, daughter of John Gotti, reality television star, author
 Michael P. Grace, chairman of W. R. Grace and Company (NYC) and Grace Brothers & Co. Ltd. (London, England)
 C. Z. Guest, socialite, Truman Capote swan, celebrity gardener, author
 Cornelia Guest, socialite, crowned "Deb of the Decade" by Andy Warhol (1980s), author
 Frederick Guest, polo player, philanthropist, British politician and peer
 Winston Frederick Churchill Guest, Anglo-American polo champion, Phipps family heir
 Marie Norton Harriman, First Lady of New York, wife of W. Averell Harriman, art collector
 Thomas Hastings, architect, partner of Carrère and Hastings
 Leila Hadley, socialite, author
 Charles Kelman, eye surgeon, medical pioneer
 Gustave Maurice Heckscher, pioneer seaplane aviator
 Frederick Hicks, congressman, diplomat
 James N. Hill, Great Northern Railway heir, son of "the empire builder" James J. Hill and Margaret Sawyer Hill
 Thomas Hitchcock, polo champion
 Adam C. Hochfelder, real estate magnate
 Edward Francis Hutton, financier and co-founder of E. F. Hutton & Co.
 Matthew Ianniello, restaurateur, alleged Genovese crime family acting boss.
 Kevin James, actor
 Reza Jarrahy, plastic surgeon, former husband of actress Geena Davis
 Peter S. Kalikow, real estate magnate, car collector, former Forbes 400 member, New York Post owner, Metropolitan Transportation Authority chairman and Port Authority of New York and New Jersey commissioner
 Foxhall Keene, champion automobile racer, polo player, thoroughbred breeder, purported original namesake for "Chicken à la King"
 Ed Kranepool, New York Mets first baseman
 Nicole Krauss, author, wife of Jonathan Safran Foer
 James Lanier, entrepreneur, banker, founder of Winslow, Lanier & Co., owner of Lanier Mansion
 John LeBoutillier, U.S. congressman
 Jack Liebowitz, original co-owner of DC Comics
 William Goadby Loew, financier and stockbroker 
 James Brown Lord, architect
 Charles B. Macdonald, builder of first U.S. 18-hole golf course and several other influential courses, founder of United States Golf Association
 Jack Martins, NYS Senator, former mayor of Mineola
 Marvin Middlemark, inventor of/patent-holder for the "rabbit ears" television antenna
 Devereux Milburn, champion polo player, attorney at Carter Ledyard & Milburn, son of John G. Milburn
 E.D. Morgan III, Morgan family heir, Pioneer Fund director, grandson/namesake of the NY governor and U.S. Senator
 Bess Myerson, Miss America (1945)
 Nas, rapper
 Brandon Nimmo, MLB outfielder for the New York Mets 
 John Parisella, successful horse trainer
 Darragh Park, artist, executor of the James Schuyler estate
 Angel Penna, Sr., thoroughbred horse trainer
 Murray Pergament, founder of Pergament Home Centers
 Henry Phipps, Jr., Carnegie Steel Company partner, philanthropist
 Henry Carnegie Phipps, Carnegie Steel Company heir, Phipps family heir, sportsman, Wheatley Stable owner
 Hubert Beaumont Phipps, Phipps family and Grace family heir, publisher, thoroughbred breeder
 John Shaffer Phipps, director of U.S. Steel and W. R. Grace & Co.
 Lillian Bostwick Phipps, socialite, thoroughbred horse stable owner
 Michael Grace Phipps, polo champion, Phipps family and Grace family heir, board member of Bessemer Trust and W.R. Grace & Co.
 Ogden Phipps, Carnegie Steel heir, tennis champion, philanthropist
 Leonard Pines, owner of Hebrew National
 Fred Plum, neurosurgeon who developed the term "persistent vegetative state" and treated President Nixon
 Lilly Pulitzer, designer, socialite
 Aby Rosen, art collector and real estate mogul with holdings including the Seagram Building, Lever House, W South Beach, Gramercy Park Hotel, Paramount Hotel, and Planet Hollywood Miracle Mile Shops
 Ely Sakhai, notorious gallery owner and art forger
 Harvey Sanders, Nautica CEO, chairman of the board and president, Under Armour director  
 Steven Schonfeld, American billionaire, ranked 371 on Forbes 400
 Eleanor Searle, philanthropist, singer
 John Shalam, founder and CEO of Audiovox
 Igor Sikorsky, airplane developer and first major producer of helicopters
 David Simon, CEO of Simon Property Group
 Bernice Steinbaum, gallerist, dealer, curator, juror, speaker, author
 Howard Stern, entertainer
 Beatrice Straight, member of Whitney family, Academy Award-winning actress
 Willard Dickerman Straight, banker, diplomat, co-founder of The New Republic magazine
 Harold E. Talbott, early aviator, president of Dayton-Wright Airplane Company, third United States Secretary of the Air Force.
 Seabury Tredwell, future owner of what is now the Merchant's House Museum in Manhattan
 Barry Van Gerbig, socialite, son-in-law of Douglas Fairbanks, Jr., NHL owner
 Consuelo Vanderbilt, Vanderbilt family heiress, wife of, firstly, Charles Spencer-Churchill, 9th Duke of Marlborough and, secondly, record-breaking pilot Jacques Balsan
 Gloria Vanderbilt, Vanderbilt family heiress, clothing and perfume designer
 Harold Stirling Vanderbilt, Vanderbilt family heir, prominent railroad industrialist, philanthropist and yachtsman
 William Kissam Vanderbilt II, Vanderbilt family heir, prominent motor racer and yachtsman
 Francis Skiddy von Stade, Sr., polo champion, Saratoga Race Course president
 Ira Waldbaum, built up the Waldbaum's supermarket chain from a six store operation into one of the largest in the Northeast
 George Herbert Walker, banker and businessman, namesake and grandfather of U.S. president George H. W. Bush, namesake and great-grandfather of U.S. President George W. Bush
 Jimmy Walker, flamboyant New York City Mayor, part of the powerful Tammany Hall machine
 Electra Havemeyer Webb, collector, philanthropist, founder of the Shelburne Museum
 James Watson Webb, owner of New York Courier and Enquirer newspaper, politician
 J. Watson Webb, Jr., film editor, heir to both the Havemeyer and Vanderbilt families
 William Collins Whitney, founder of the Whitney family, financier, U.S. Cabinet member, thoroughbred stable owner
 Cornelius Vanderbilt Whitney, Vanderbilt family and Whitney family heir, financier, philanthropist
 Dorothy Payne Whitney, Whitney family heiress, co-founder of The New Republic magazine and the Dartington School
 Gertrude Vanderbilt Whitney, Vanderbilt family heiress, founder of the Whitney Museum of American Art
 Harry Payne Whitney, member of Whitney family, thoroughbred horse breeder
 Marylou Whitney, socialite, philanthropist, thoroughbred stable owner
 Charles E. Wilson, president of General Motors, U.S. Cabinet member
 Robert Winthrop, member of the Dudley–Winthrop family, banker, philanthropist, namesake of Winthrop-University Hospital
 Steve Witkoff, Witkoff Group founder, owner of the Woolworth Building
 Louis Wolfson, financier, thoroughbred horse owner
 Raphael Yakoby, creator of Hpnotiq
 Alexei Yashin, professional hockey player, New York Islanders

In popular culture

Film
 Admission (2013), starring Tina Fey and Paul Rudd  filmed at HorseAbility at SUNY Old Westbury 
 The Age of Innocence (1993), starring Daniel Day-Lewis: the scenes depicting May Welland (Winona Ryder)'s Floridian mansion were actually shot in Old Westbury
 American Gangster (2007), starring Denzel Washington: Dominic Cattano's house
 Arthur (1981): the mansion that Arthur (Dudley Moore) lives in
 The Associate (1996): Whoopi Goldberg's character Ayers attends an Old Westbury house party dressed as Cutty (a man) for the first time
 Bernard and Doris (2008): the Phipps' estate used for the Doris Duke (played by Susan Sarandon) mansion in Newport, Rhode Island
 Blue Jasmine (2013): Old Westbury estate used in this Woody Allen film 
 The Bourne Legacy (2012), starring Jeremy Renner, Rachel Weisz, Edward Norton: residences on the village's famous tree-lined street were shot for the film
 Captain Valedor (2006): filmed in an Old Westbury home and backyard
 Cruel Intentions (1999): the home of Kathryn (Sarah Michelle Gellar) and Sebastian's (Ryan Phillippe's) Aunt Helen on Long Island, where Annette (Reese Witherspoon) is living
 The Curse of the Jade Scorpion (2001) by Woody Allen: scenes shot at Old Westbury gardens and mansion
  Dark Horse (2012), starring Jordan Gelber, Selma Blair, Christopher Walken and Mia Farrow: Old Westbury homes were shot to serve as Abe's (Gelber's) home and the "fantasy" home
 From the Terrace (1960), starring Paul Newman and Joanne Woodward
 Hitch (2005), starring Will Smith and Eva Mendes: Allegra Cole's
 Just Tell Me What You Want (1980) by Sidney Lumet
 Love Story (1970), starring Ali MacGraw and Ryan O'Neal: the home of Oliver's wealthy father
 Lovesick (1983), starring Dudley Moore, Elizabeth McGovern, and Alec Guinness
 The Manchurian Candidate (2004): the Phipps' estate used for the home of Eleanor Shaw (played by Meryl Streep)
 The Muppets (2011), Phipps mansion filmed as home of Tex Richman, an oil tycoon played by Chris Cooper
 No Hard Feelings (2023), starring Jennifer Lawrence and Matthew Broderick: “giant house party” scene filmed in Old Westbury home 
 North by Northwest (1959) by Alfred Hitchcock: Townsend's home, where Roger Thornhill (Cary Grant) is taken after being kidnapped
 Reversal of Fortune (1990), starring Glenn Close and Jeremy Irons: the Knole estate used for interiors of the Sunny von Bülow mansion
 The Swimmer (1968), starring Burt Lancaster
 To Wong Foo, Thanks for Everything! Julie Newmar (1995), starring Wesley Snipes and Patrick Swayze: film's final scene
 Wolf (1994): the country home of Laura (Michelle Pfeiffer) where Jack Nicholson's character first becomes a wolf, which appears on the DVD cover

Television
 Alpha House: The forthcoming second season of the Amazon series starring John Goodman had scenes filmed in an Old Westbury estate 
 Gossip Girl: Season two's nineteenth episode, "The Grandfather", originally airing March 23, 2009, featured an Old Westbury estate as the "van der Bilt" mansion
 Paper Dolls: 1984 primetime drama starring Morgan Fairchild, Nicollette Sheridan, Lauren Hutton and Mimi Rogers
 Person of Interest: Season one's seventeenth episode, "Baby Blue", originally airing March 8, 2012, included Moretti's car crash and other road scenes filmed in Old Westbury. The series returned to Old Westbury for the fifth season's sixth episode, "A More Perfect Union", originally airing May 23, 2016, which included horse-riding scenes at the Dudley–Winthrop family estate and a wedding at the Alexander de Seversky mansion.
 Royal Pains: Season one's third episode, "Strategic Planning", originally airing June 18, 2009, features the Phipps estate as the home of a wealthy senator and used the lawn as a University of Notre Dame Fighting Irish practice field
 Sex and the City: Season five's finale episode, "I Love a Charade", originally airing September 8, 2002, featured an Old Westbury home in place of an estate in the Hamptons

Reality television
 America's Castles: A&E Network documentary series on gilded age homes featured Peggy Phipps Boegner touring one of the Phipps family's estates on the episode airing August 8, 1995, entitled "The Gold Coast".
 Growing Up Gotti: A&E Network reality series about life in Victoria Gotti's  Old Westbury home in 2004 and 2005
 Princesses: Long Island: Bravo reality series, which features Old Westbury resident Erica Gimbel as one of the six original cast members
 Secrets and Wives: upcoming Bravo reality series, that features the lives of women living in Old Westbury and surrounding towns, including residents Cori Goldfarb and Liza Sandler, who was infamously caught cheating on her then husband with Donny Deutsch
 Selling New York: In season five's first episode, "A Prince Looks for a Property...", originally airing January 19, 2012, Prince Lorenzo Borghese views an Old Westbury estate, along with two other North Shore properties, but ultimately does not purchase any of the properties because he found that they each were too large

Wealth 
According to Bloomberg/Businessweek, as of 2011, Old Westbury is the second "richest" town in the United States, trailing behind only Palm Beach, Florida. The magazine previously dubbed the town "New York's wealthiest suburb."

Based on a study done by Bloomberg in 2015, the average household income in the village is greater than $640,000.

In 2011, Forbes, having done a study of "America's Millionaire Capitals", found that the average net worth of Old Westbury households was $19.6 million and with an average annual income of $1.2 million. The controlled study included only households with incomes greater than $200,000, which excluded only residents that are living in college dormitories and the staff of homeowners.

The village is famous for being the seat of many of New York's (and America's) wealthiest families, including the Phippses, Vanderbilts, Whitneys, Webbs, Du Ponts, Winthrops, Mortimers, Belmonts and Huttons. While many of these older families—the founding members of the social elite and those that emerged during the gilded age—still count members as Old Westbury residents, the village has also maintained a substantial set of industrialists, businessmen, collectors, athletes and entertainers.

The Old Westbury Fund is a hedge fund that is named after the town.

When Forbes asked billionaire investor Steven Schonfeld what the "wisest investment" he ever made was, his answer was "Old Westbury land".

References

External links 
 Official website

Town of North Hempstead, New York
Oyster Bay (town), New York
Villages in New York (state)
Villages in Nassau County, New York